Die Kunst des Krieges is the 992nd episode of the television series Tatort written and directed by Thomas Roth.  It was ordered by the Austrian Broadcasting Corporation and produced by  The film was shot in Vienna and its environs. The official television premiere took place on Sunday, September 4, 2016.

Plot summary
A gruesome murder of a man occurs in a villa on the outskirts of Vienna. The man had been tortured before he was killed. The detective Bibi Fellner (Adele Neuhauser) and her colleague Moritz Eisner (Harald Krassnitzer) begin investigating the incident. The cruelty of the murder leads the detectives to the conclusion that the victim was involved in organised crime activities. Inquiry finally puts the detectives on the trail of the pimp Andy Mittermeier and his beautiful female bodyguard Mina Sandra Nomura "Asia" (Puti Kaisar-Mihara).

Partial cast listing 

 Harald Krassnitzer as Moritz Eisner
 Adele Neuhauser as Bibi Fellner
 Simon Schwarz as Inkasso-Heinzi
 Puti Kaisar-Mihara as Mina Sandra Nomura
 Janina Rudenska as Victoria Oshchypko
 Daniel Wagner as Ramazan Tagaev

See also
Dead Pigeon on Beethoven Street (1974, Tatort episode 25)
Reifezeugnis (1977, Tatort episode 73)
 There's Something About a War

References

External links
 
 A trailer for the episode

Tatort
2016 television episodes
Austrian television shows
German-language television shows
2010s German-language films
Television episodes about murder
Drama television episodes
ORF (broadcaster)
Das Erste original programming